Chris Fitchett is an Australian writer, producer and script editor.

He has worked for many years a development and production executive for state and federal government film funding agencies including Project Manager/Deputy Director of Film Victoria, CEO of the Commercial Television Production Fund, and Chief Executive of the Australian Film Commission.

He teaches at Bond University.

Select credits
Melanie and Me (1975) - producer, director
Queensland (1976) - producer
Blood Money (1980) - director, writer
Desolation Angels (1982) - director, writer
Cassandra (1987) - writer
The 13th Floor (1988) - script editor
Quads (2001–02) (TV series) - script editor
Blurred (2002) - producer
Under the Radar (2003) - producer
Stoned Bros (2009) - script editor
A Heartbeat Away (2011) - producer
The Fear of Darkness (2015) - writer, director, executive producer

References

Australian film producers
Living people
Year of birth missing (living people)
Place of birth missing (living people)
Academic staff of Bond University
Australian screenwriters